FCI Aravali Gypsum & Minerals India Ltd. (FAGMIL) is a public sector enterprise in India operating in the field of mining operations since 1952, supplying mineral Gypsum.

FAGMIL was separated from the Fertilizer Corporation of India in February 2003.

References

External links
 Official Website
 Department of Chemicals & Fertilisers (India)

Mining companies of India
Companies based in Rajasthan
Mining in Rajasthan
1952 establishments in Rajasthan
Indian companies established in 1952